is a Japanese seinen magazine published by ASCII Media Works (formerly MediaWorks). It first went on sale on October 27, 2005, and is sold every month on the twenty-seventh. The magazine features information on video games, manga, and light novels. A special edition version of the magazine called Dengeki Black Maoh was published quarterly from September 2007 to June 2010.

Series serialized

In Dengeki Maoh
A Tropical Fish Yearns for Snow
Aruite Ippo!!
Black Bullet
Bokusatsu Tenshi Dokuro-chan
Disgaea 2: Cursed Memories
Enburio
eM -eNCHANTarM-
Furatto Rain
Girl Friend BETA
GT-giRl (ongoing)
Heat the Pig Liver (ongoing)
Himekami no Miko
Immortal Grand Prix
Iriya no Sora, UFO no Natsu
Itsudemo Jakusansei
KanColle: Shimakaze Compilation
Lotte no Omocha!
Mattaku Saikin no Tantei to Kitara
Oroka na Tenshi wa Akuma to Odoru
Persona 4
Prince of Stride Galaxy Rush (ongoing)
Rumble Roses
Rune Factory 2
Seiyū Radio no Ura Omote
Spice and Wolf
Sword Art Online: Hollow Realization
Tales of the Abyss
Tenshō Gakuen Gekkō Roku
The Idolmaster Colorful Days
The Magical Revolution of the Reincarnated Princess and the Genius Young Lady
This Art Club Has a Problem! (ongoing)
Touring After the Apocalypse (ongoing)
Utawarerumono
Zatsutabi: That's Journey (ongoing)

In Dengeki Black Maoh
100Yen Shop Kiandou
Femme Fatale
Hanjyuku Tencho
Heavy Object
Ichigeki Sacchu!! HoiHoi-san Legacy (ongoing)
Kagaminochou no Kaguya
Karakasa no Saien
Kizuato
Nanatsusa
Persona 3
Persona 3 - Portable Dengeki Comic Anthology
Persona 4
Queen's Blade Struggle (ongoing)
Sukoshi Fushigi Manga Koto-chan
Tama Biyori
Tama Hiyo
Tokubetsuyomikiri - Mirukashi
Tokubetsuyomikiri - The Writing of Secret Minds
Yamanko

Special edition version

Dengeki Black Maoh
 was a Japanese seinen manga magazine published by ASCII Media Works. It was a special edition version of Dengeki Maoh that was published quarterly from September 19, 2007 and June 19, 2010.

Notes

References

External links
Dengeki Maoh's official website 
''Dengeki Black Maoh'''s official website 

2005 establishments in Japan
ASCII Media Works magazines
Anime magazines published in Japan
Light novel magazines
Seinen manga magazines
Magazines established in 2005
MediaWorks magazines
Magazines published in Tokyo
Monthly manga magazines published in Japan
Video game magazines published in Japan